The Sanremo Music Festival 1994 was the 44th annual Sanremo Music Festival, held at the Teatro Ariston in Sanremo, province of Imperia, in the late February 1994 and broadcast by Rai 1.

The show was presented by Pippo Baudo, who also served as the artistic director, with singer Anna Oxa and model Cannelle. Antonella Clerici hosted the segments with the juries.

The winner of the Big Artists section was Aleandro Baldi with the ballad "Passerà", while Giorgio Faletti ranked second and won the Critics Award with "Signor tenente", an anti-mafia rap song inspired by massacres of Capaci and Via D'Amelio. Andrea Bocelli won the Newcomers section with the song "Il mare calmo della sera".

After every night Rai 1 broadcast DopoFestival,  a talk show about the Festival with the participation of singers and  journalists. It was hosted by Mara Venier  and Pippo Baudo with Renato Zero and Roberto D'Agostino.

Participants and results

Big Artists

Newcomers

Guests

Notes
A  Squadra Italia was a supergroup formed by Nilla Pizzi, Mario Merola, Jimmy Fontana, Wilma Goich, Rosanna Fratello, Lando Fiorini, Gianni Nazzaro, Wess, Toni Santagata, Giuseppe Cionfoli and Manuela Villa (Claudio Villa's daughter).

References 

Sanremo Music Festival by year
1994 in Italian music 
1994 in Italian television 
1994 music festivals